Emilio Lazzari (1823 in Arcisate or Legnano – 1902 in Turate, Milan), was an Italian painter, mainly depicting landscapes.

He studied in Brera Academy, and won an award there in 1850. He was a resident of Milan. He exhibited few works. His canvas Salve! was exhibited at Rome alla Mostra Nazionale del 1883, and Ultima onda che venne at Turin in 1884.

References

19th-century Italian painters
19th-century Italian male artists
Italian male painters
20th-century Italian painters
20th-century Italian male artists
1823 births
1902 deaths
Painters from Milan
Italian landscape painters
Brera Academy alumni